is a single release by Japanese boy band Arashi. "Ashita no Kioku" was used as the theme song for the drama The Quiz Show 2 starring Arashi member Sho Sakurai, and "Crazy Moon (Kimi wa Muteki)" was used as the theme song for Kose's Esprique Precious cosmetics line commercial. The single was released in three editions: a regular edition containing a bonus track and instrumental versions of all the songs released in the single, and two limited edition both containing a DVD with a music video of one of the A-side tracks.

Single information
"Ashita no Kioku" is a mid-tempo and dramatic number, with lyrics about an "indelible past" and a hope for a better future. The full song was first heard on Ohno's radio program Arashi Discovery on May 1, 2009, and first shots of the promotional video premiered on NTV's news program Zoom-in Super! on May 13, 2009. A longer, two-minute preview of the song's music video premiered on Space Shower TV on May 22, 2009. The song was named Best Theme Song in the 61st Television Drama Academy Awards.

"Crazy Moon (Kimi wa Muteki)" was described a fast-paced 80's themed dance number. About one month before the single's release, the group performed the song on the Japanese music show Utaban on April 26, 2009.

Chart performance
The single debuted at the number-one position on Oricon Daily Singles Ranking, selling over 230,000 copies in the first day. By the end of its first week, it sold 502,487 copies, the group's second best debut week sales figures since their 1999 debut single, "Arashi". With its first week sales of over 502,000, the single has the best first week sales of 2009. Also, with their previous single "Believe/Kumorinochi, Kaisei," the single makes Arashi the first artist in seven years and seven months to have achieved two consecutive singles that exceeds the 500,000 mark in first week sales.

The single is the second single to cross the 600,000 mark in 2009, after the group's first 2009 single release, "Believe/Kumorinochi, Kaisei." It was certified Double Platinum by Recording Industry Association of Japan (RIAJ). By selling a total of 620,557 copies by the end of the year, "Ashita no Kioku/Crazy Moon (Kimi wa Muteki)" is the second best-selling single of 2009 in Japan, right after "Believe/Kumorinochi, Kaisei".

Track listing

Charts and certifications

Weekly charts

Year-end charts

Certifications

Release history

Footnotes

References

External links
 Ashita no Kioku/Crazy Moon (Kimi wa Muteki) product information

Arashi songs
2009 singles
Oricon Weekly number-one singles
Billboard Japan Hot 100 number-one singles
Japanese television drama theme songs
J Storm singles